Mount Keinath is a mountain,  high, rising at the east side of the terminus of Boomerang Glacier in the Deep Freeze Range, Victoria Land, Antarctica. It was mapped by the United States Geological Survey from surveys and U.S. Navy air photos, 1955–63, and was named by the Advisory Committee on Antarctic Names for Gerald E. Keinath, a biolab administrator at McMurdo Station in the 1965–66 season.

References

Mountains of Victoria Land
Scott Coast